This is a list of various exponents of Forza Italia (current and former deputies, senators, ministers, MEPs, regional presidents, leading regional-level politicians, mayors of big and medium-sized cities and important members of party's national organs), divided by political origin (that is to say, of what party they were members or supporters shortly before the 1992-93 crisis and realignment of the political system, and of the foundation of Forza Italia in 1994).

The list shows well the political heterogeneity of members of Forza Italia.

Ex-Christian Democrats

A
Giancarlo Abelli
Antonio Agogliati
Pietro Aiello
Angelino Alfano
Gioacchino Alfano
Alfredo Antoniozzi
Sabatino Aracu
Gianantonio Arnoldi
Franco Asciutti
Paolo Avezzù
Claudio Azzolini
Antonio Azzollini
Antonio Barbieri

B
Vincenzo Barba
Paolo Barelli
Paolo Bartolozzi
Raffaele Bazzoni
Maurizio Bernardo
Maurizio Bertucci
Gianpaolo Bettamio
Laura Bianconi
Massimo Blasoni
Guido Boscagli
Gabriele Boscetto
Aldo Brancher
Donato Bruno
Maria Burani

C
Battista Caligiuri
Diego Cammarata
Cesare Campa
Giuseppe Castiglione
Ugo Cavallera
Francesco Chirilli
Marco Cicala
Angelo Maria Cicolani
Salvatore Cicu
Michele Cimino
Manlio Collavini
Giuseppe Cossiga
Rosario Giorgio Costa
Mariangela Cotto
Rocco Crimi
Guido Crosetto

D
Barbara Degani
Walter De Rigo
Giovanni Deodato
Luigi Di Bartolomeo
Manuela Di Centa
Maurizio Dinelli
Ida D'Ippolito
Domenico Di Virgilio

F
Luigi Fabbri
Giuseppe Fallica
Giuseppe Massimo Ferro
Giuseppe Fini
Giuseppe Firrarello
Raffaele Fitto
Giuliana Fontanella
Roberto Formigoni
Gianstefano Frigerio
Stefania Fuscagni

G
Fabio Garagnani
Elisabetta Gardini
Giuseppe Gargani
Fabio Gava
Basilio Germanà
Mariastella Gelmini
Antonio Girfatti
Francesco Giro
Pasquale Giuliano
Isidoro Gottardo
Luigi Grillo
Vittorio Guasti
Furio Gubetti

I
Maria Claudia Ioannucci
Michele Iorio
Cosimo Izzo

L
Enrico La Loggia
Giorgio La Spisa
Cosimo Latronico
Luigi Lazzari
Ivano Leccisi
Giampiero Leo
Gianni Letta
Simonetta Licastro Scardino
Maurizio Lupi

M
Francesco Maione
Luigi Manfredi
Mario Mantovani
Renzo Marangon
Salvatore Marano
Giuseppe Marinello
Bruno Marini
Antonio Martusciello
Giovanni Marras
Antonio Marzano
Mario Masini
Giovanni Mauro
Mario Mauro
Guido Milanese
Filippo Misuraca
Salvatore Misuraca
Fabio Minoli Rota
Gabriella Mondello
Danilo Moretti
Nino Mormino

N
Osvaldo Napoli
Benedetto Nicotra
Giuseppe Nocco

P
Leonardo Padrin
Alessandro Pagano
Rocco Palese
Antonio Palmieri
Maurizio Paniz
Eolo Giovanni Parodi
Adriano Paroli
Renzo Patria
Paola Pelino
Italico Perlini
Margherita Peroni
Aldo Perrotta
Maria Gabriella Pinto
Giuseppe Pisanu
Giancarlo Pittelli
Piero Pizzi
Angelo Pollina
Egidio Ponzo

R
Marcello Raimondi
Nicolò Rassù
Paolo Ricciotti
Paolo Ricciuti
Marcello Rollo
Massimo Romagnoli
Giuseppe Romele
Luciano Rossi
Roberto Rosso
Gianni Rossoni
Clodovaldo Ruffato
Antonio Russo

S
Mario Sala
Stanislao Sambin
Giacomo Santini
Angelo Santori
Michele Saponara
Claudio Scajola
Gianluigi Scaltritti
Renato Schifani
Gustavo Selva
Remo Sernagiotto
Grazia Sestini
Giorgio Simeoni
Ada Spadoni Urbani
Francesco Stagno D'Alcontres
Francesco Stradella

T
Lucio Tarquinio
Carlo Alberto Tesserin
Piero Testoni

U
Paolo Uggè

V
Paolo Valentini Puccitelli
Riccardo Ventre
Giacomo Ventura
Marcello Vernola
Antonio Verro
Guido Viceconte
Gesuele Vilasi
Luigi Villani
Alfredo Vito

Z
Francesco Zama
Valter Zanetta
Guido Ziccone
Marino Zorzato
Sante Zuffada
Michele Zuin

Ex-Socialists
(factions: We Blue Reformers, Free Foundation and Young Italy)

A
Valentina Aprea
Roberto Antonione

B
Gianni Baget Bozzo
Simone Baldelli
Monica Stefania Baldi
Massimo Baldini
Paolo Bonaiuti
Anna Cinzia Bonfrisco
Margherita Boniver
Renato Brunetta
Francesco Brusco
Giulio Camber

C
Giampiero Cantoni
Luigi Cesaro
Enrico Cesaroni
Renato Chisso
Fabrizio Cicchitto
Alessandro Colucci
Francesco Colucci
Domenico Contestabile
Stefania Craxi

D
Giulio Di Donato

F
Gaetano Fasolino
Giuliano Ferrara
Franco Frattini

G
Giorgio Galvagno
Antonio Gentile
Giuseppe Gentile
Antonio Guidi
Paolo Guzzanti

L
Vanni Lenna
Innocenzo Leontini
Claudia Lombardo

I
Raffaele Iannuzzi

M
Rinaldo Magnani
Alberto Magnolfi
Chiara Moroni
Francesco Musotto

N
Emiddio Novi

O
Renata Olivieri

P
Gaetano Pecorella
Mario Pepe
Marcello Pera
Mauro Pili
Stefano Pillitteri
Sergio Pizzolante

R
Ettore Romoli

S
Maurizio Sacconi
Jole Santelli
Amalia Sartori
Umberto Scapagnini
Aldo Scarabosio
Giancarlo Serafini
Giorgio Stracquadanio

T
Carlo Taormina
Renzo Tondo
Giulio Tremonti

Ex-Liberals
(faction: Popular Liberalism)

A
Maria Elisabetta Alberti Casellati
Maria Teresa Armosino

B
Isabella Bertolini
Alfredo Biondi

C
Roberto Cassinelli
Enrico Costa
Raffaele Costa

F
Gregorio Fontana
Pieralfonso Fratta Pasini

G
Giancarlo Galan
Fabio Gava
Antonio Gazzarra
Niccolò Ghedini

L
Carlo Laurora

M
Antonio Martino
Lorena Milanato
Enrico Musso

N
Enrico Nan
Raffaele Nervi

O
Andrea Orsini

P
Alberto Pasquali
Andrea Pastore
Saverio Porcari
Cesare Previti

R
Laura Ravetto
Dario Rivolta
Paolo Romani

S
Carlo Saffioti
Paolo Scarpa Bonazza Buora
Egidio Sterpa

U
Giuliano Urbani

V
Giuseppe Vegas

Z
Pierantonio Zanettin
Tiziano Zigiotto

Ex-Republicans
Pietro Paolo Amato
Luigi Casero
Guglielmo Castagnetti
Simone Di Cagno Abbrescia
Jas Gawronski
Salvatore Fleres
Piergiorgio Massidda
Antonio Nervegna
Alessandro Nicolò
Mario Pescante
Gilberto Picchetto Fratin
Denis Verdini
Alberto Zorzoli

Ex-Social Democrats
(faction: Clubs of Reformist Initiative)
Nicola Cosentino
Massimo Guarischi
Carmelo Morra
Henry Richard Rizzi
Ermanno Russo
Paolo Russo
Simona Vicari
Carlo Vizzini

Ex-Radicals
(micro-party: Liberal Reformers)
Benedetto Della Vedova
Giuseppe Calderisi
Gaetano Quagliariello
Marcello Pera
Francesca Scopelliti
Marco Taradash
Massimo Teodori
Elio Vito

Ex-Communists
Sandro Bondi
Giampietro Borghini
Massimo Ferlini
Lodovico Festa
Renzo Foa
Antonella Maiolo
Tiziana Maiolo

Ex-Demo-Proletarians and other extreme-leftists
Massimo Caprara
Gianfranco Miccichè

Ex-Leghisti
Roberto Asquini
Alberto Cirio
Mauro Delladio
Albertino Gabana
Daniele Galli
Furio Gubetti
Enrico Hüllweck
Lucio Malan
Marco Pottino
Enrico Tibaldi

Ex-Missini
Michaela Biancofiore
Mara Carfagna
Ugo Gianfranco Grimaldi
Massimo Mantovani
Domenico Mennitti

Ex-Monarchists
Antonio Tajani

Unknown previous allegiance
Gabriele Albertini
Alessandro Antichi
Giacomo Baiamonte
Massimo Maria Berruti
Mariella Bocciardo
Gabriella Carlucci
Valerio Carrara
Francesco Casoli
Fiorella Ceccacci
Annamaria Celesti
Roberto Centaro
Remigio Ceroni
Ombretta Colli
Gianfranco Conte
Romano Comincioli
Antonio D'Alì
Giovanni Dell'Elce
Marcello Dell'Utri
Claudio Fazzone
Luigi Fedele
Mario Francesco Ferrara
Salvatore Ferrigno
Ilario Floresta
Pietro Franzoso
Enzo Ghigo
Sestino Giacomoni
Gaspare Giudice
Antonello Iannarilli
Giorgio Jannone
Giorgio Lainati
Giancarlo Laurini
Antonio Leone
Antonio Lorusso
Pietro Lunardi
Franco Malvano
Paolo Marcheschi
Giulio Marini
Salvatore Mazzaracchio
Giustina Mistrello Destro
Pasquale Nessa
Nitto Francesco Palma
Giuseppe Palumbo
Patrizia Paoletti Tangheroni
Enrico Pianetta
Guglielmo Picchi
Lorenzo Piccioni
Filippo Piccone
Guido Podestà
Guido Possa
Stefania Prestigiacomo
Antonella Rebuzzi
Fedele Sanciu
Luigi Scotti
Lucio Stanca
Vincenzo Taddei
Antonio Tomassini
Roberto Tortoli
Mario Valducci
Valentino Valentini
Cosimo Ventucci
Luigi Vitali
Stefano Zappalà

Forza Italia